The BMW N54 is a twin-turbocharged straight-six petrol engine that was produced from 2006 to 2016. It is BMW's first mass-produced turbocharged petrol engine and BMW's first turbocharged petrol engine since the limited-production BMW M106 was discontinued in 1986. The N54 debuted at the 2006 Geneva Motor Show and was launched in the 335i model of the E90/E91/E92/E93 3 Series range.

Following the introduction of its BMW N55 successor in 2009, the N54 began to be phased out. The final model powered by the N54 is the E89 Z4 roadster, which was produced until 2016.

The N54 has won six straight International Engine of the Year awards and three straight Ward's 10 Best Engines awards.

There is no BMW M version of the N54, however a high-output version of the N54 is used in the 1 Series M Coupe, 135iS, Z4 35iS and 335iS models.

Design 
The N54 was produced alongside the naturally aspirated BMW N53 engine; both engines have direct injection, double-VANOS (variable valve timing), an open-deck engine block and an electric water pump.

Turbocharging is a key difference between the N54 and BMW's previous straight-six engines. The N54 has two small low-pressure turbochargers to minimise turbo lag. BMW's marketed the twin-turbo as "TwinPower Turbo", although the term has since been used for engines which have a single twin-scroll turbocharger.

The N54's direct injection system (called "High Precision Injection" by BMW) uses piezo injectors. Its N55 successor uses solenoid-type injectors, because the piezo injectors are more expensive and not reaching their full potential to obtain the "lean burn" benefit.

Versions 

225 kW version 

Applications:
 2006–2010 E90/E91/E92/E93 335i
 2007–2010 E60/E61 535i
 2007–2010 E82/E88 135i
 2008–2010 E71 X6 xDrive35i
 2009–2016 E89 Z4 sDrive35i

240 kW version 
A variant of the N54B30 with higher peak power and torque is used in the 2008-2012 740i and E92 335is.

Applications:
 2008–2012 F01 740i
 2011–2013 E92/E93 335is

250 kW version 
The most powerful version of the N54 is found in the E82 1 Series M Coupe and the E89 Z4 sDrive 35is.

Applications:
 2011 E82 1 Series M Coupe
 2011–2016 E89 Z4 sDrive35is

Alpina 
Biturbo engine by Alpina based on the N54B30, with upgrades including the engine control unit, oil cooler and pistons.

265 kW version 
This is Alpina's initial version of the N54, producing .

Applications:
 2007–2010 Alpina B3 (E90)

294 kW version 
Applications:
 2010–2013 Alpina B3 S

300 kW version 
Applications:
 2012–2013 Alpina B3 GT3

Critical reception 
Car & Driver noted the N54 had minimal turbo lag and "in feel and sound the twin-turbo could pass for naturally aspirated". The N54-engined F01 740i was also praised for its linear power delivery.

Comparing the N54-engined E60 535i with the 550i (using a 4.8–litre naturally aspirated V8), one reviewer noted that the V8 model had more torque but was "only marginally quicker than the 535i" and that the additional weight of the V8 engine was noticeable on twisty mountain roads.

High-Pressure Fuel Pump failures 
In the United States, some N54 engines experienced failures of the High Pressure Fuel Pump (HPFP), resulting a class action lawsuit, a voluntary recall and an extended warranty for the HPFP.

Failure of the HPFP can cause the engine to suddenly stop functioning, which has caused several near-misses on highways. BMW was aware of HPFP problems, describing them in internal Technical Service Bulletins as "driveability problems".

In April 2009, a class action suit was filed against BMW in connection with HPFP failures. BMW settled the suit in June 2010. On 26 October 2010, following an ABC News story about HPFP failures, BMW announced a recall of vehicles with the pump in question from manufacturing years 2007–2010. The recall was applied to 130,000 cars, resulting in the replacement of the HPFP in approximately 40,000 of these cars.

On some cars, the HPFP was replaced multiple times without resolving the issue, potentially leading to the car being refunded under the Lemon Laws in some states.

Extended warranty in the United States 

An updated design for the fuel injectors was also introduced.

These warranty extensions only apply to the United States.

See also
 BMW
 List of BMW engines

References

N54
Straight-six engines
Gasoline engines by model